The northeastern Ukraine campaign was a theatre of operation from 24 February to 8 April 2022 in the 2022 Russian invasion of Ukraine for control of two provinces (oblasts) in Ukraine — Chernihiv Oblast and Sumy Oblast. On 4 April 2022,  Ukrainian authorities said that Russian troops had mostly withdrawn from Sumy Oblast and no longer occupied any towns or villages in the area. Later that evening Ukrainian authorities claimed that Russian forces had withdrawn from Chernihiv Oblast, which was confirmed by the Pentagon by 6 April. In addition, it took place from February 24 to May 14 in Kharkiv Oblast. On 14 May, the ISW reported that: “Ukraine thus appears to have won the battle of Kharkiv.” The Mayor of Kharkiv said to the BBC:
"There was no shelling in the city for the last five days. There was only one attempt from Russians to hit the city with a missile rocket near Kharkiv airport, but the missile was eliminated by Ukrainian Air Defence."

Overview 

The northeastern Ukraine offensive was a major thrust by Russian armed forces on February 24, 2022, into Chernihiv and Sumy oblasts and their administrative capitals—Chernihiv and Sumy. Chernihiv was under siege for more than five weeks. The Ukrainians lost a battle for control of Sumy Oblast's second city, Konotop, 90 kilometers from the Russian border, on 25 February. A separate advance into Sumy Oblast the same day attacked the city of Sumy, just  from the Russo-Ukrainian border. The Russian advance bogged down in urban fighting, and Ukrainian forces successfully held the city. According to Ukrainian sources, more than 100 Russian armoured vehicles were destroyed and dozens of soldiers were captured. Russian forces also attacked Okhtyrka, deploying thermobaric weapons.

While the battle of Sumy raged, Russian forces moved west along highways from Sumy, reaching Brovary, an eastern suburb of Kyiv, on 4 March. In an assessment of the campaign on 4 March, Frederick Kagan wrote that the "Sumy axis is currently the most successful and dangerous Russian avenue of advance on Kyiv." He noted that the geography favored mechanized advances as the terrain "is flat and sparsely populated, offering few good defensive positions."

According to the Institute for the Study of War, since Russian forces failed to secure any new territory in the theater after 8 March, it is possible that they redeployed forces from eastern Kyiv to defend against Ukrainian counterattacks in Sumy Oblast.

On 2 April 2022 all of Kyiv Oblast, including  Brovary, was declared free of invaders by the Ukrainian Ministry of Defense after Russian troops left the area. On 4 April 2022 Russian troops had mostly withdrawn from Sumy Oblast and no longer occupied any towns or villages in the area. Later in the day Ukrainian authorities said Russian troops had also withdrawn from Chernihiv Oblast. The Pentagon confirmed on 6 April that the Russian army had left Chernihiv Oblast, but Sumy Oblast remained contested. On 7 April, Dmytro Zhyvytskyi, governor of Sumy Oblast, said that all Russian troops had left the region, but the territory was still unsafe due to rigged explosives and other ammunition Russian troops had left behind.

On 14 May, the ISW reported that “Ukraine thus appears to have won the battle of Kharkiv.” The Mayor of Kharkiv said to the BBC:
"There was no shelling in the city for the last five days. There was only one attempt from Russians to hit the city with a missile rocket near Kharkiv airport, but the missile was eliminated by Ukrainian Air Defence."

Timeline

February

24 February

After Russian President Vladimir Putin announced a 'Special military operation in Ukraine' Russian forces crossed the Russian-Ukrainian border and began advancing towards Kharkiv. They met Ukrainian resistance, thus beginning the Battle of Kharkiv. A Russian missile struck the Chuhuiv air base, which housed Bayraktar TB2 drones. According to OSINT information the attack left damage to fuel storage areas and infrastructure. Near Chernihiv, Russian forces struck Pivka airfield. There were tank battles on the outskirts of Chernihiv and near Baturin.

25 February

At 01:39, Russian forces reportedly retreated from the city of Sumy, while Ukraine lost control of the city of Konotop the following day; the oblast's second largest city,  from the Russian border, was attacked and captured by Russian forces. Russian forces also entered Chuhuiv. By the second day, Russian forces were present in or near Snovsk, Sosnytsia, Mena, Semenivka, Hrodna, Koryukivka and Novhorod-Siverskyi.

BM-27 Uragan missiles hit a school in Okhtyrka, killing a guard and injuring an unknown number of children and a teacher. However, Ukrainian forces put up heavy resistance, forcing the Russians to retreat. Fierce fighting meanwhile continued in the northern outskirts of Kharkiv, especially in the village of Tsyrkuny.

26 February
Clashes occurred in Sumy during the day between Russian forces and Territorial Defense Forces. Russian forces reportedly managed to capture half of the city during the day, but Ukrainian forces repelled the attackers according to a Ukrainian official. Three civilians were reportedly killed in shelling on Sumy.

Dmytro Zhyvytskyi, the governor of Sumy Oblast, stated that six civilians were killed and 55 wounded in Russian shelling on Okhtyrka. Russian forces west of Sumy reportedly advanced further westwards by the night, and were apparently  from Kyiv.

The governor of Kharkiv Oblast, Oleh Synyehubov, stated that the city of Kharkiv was still under Ukrainian control. He also announced a curfew for the city. The Russian Defense Ministry later claimed that the 302nd Anti-Aircraft Missile Regiment of the Armed Forces of Ukraine in the Kharkiv Oblast had surrendered during the day, which was refuted by Ukrainian authorities.

27 February
A number of Russian vehicles advanced into Sumy from the east on 27 February, while two women were reportedly killed around the Sumy Airport.

In the early morning in Kharkiv, a gas pipeline was destroyed by Russian forces. Russian light vehicles broke into the city, with half of them reportedly destroyed by Ukrainian forces in ensuing fighting. By the afternoon, Ukrainian officials stated that Kharkiv was still under Ukrainian control despite the overnight attack by Russian forces.

Meanwhile, Hennadiy Matsegora, the mayor of Kupiansk, agreed to hand over control of the city to Russian forces and accused Ukrainian forces of abandoning it when the invasion began. He was later accused of treason by the Ukrainian Prosecutor General Iryna Venediktova.

28 February
Russian forces bombed and destroyed an oil depot in Okhtyrka. More than 70 Ukrainian soldiers were killed when their base in Okhtyrka was struck by a thermobaric bomb.

March

1 March

The Verkhovna Rada and State Special Communications Service of Ukraine claimed that 33 vehicles of Belarusian forces had entered Chernihiv Oblast from the Belarusian city of Grodno. A United States official however stated that the US had seen no such activity and Belarusian President Alexander Lukashenko denied that his country's troops had entered Ukraine. The governor of Chernihiv Oblast, Vyacheslav Chaus, stated that every access point to the city of Chernihiv was heavily mined.

That day, Russian forces captured Trostianets, who entered the city at 01:03, reportedly destroying the gate to the Round Yard and an art gallery.

2 March
Russian paratroopers landed in Kharkiv during the early morning and started clashing with Ukrainian forces. Clashes also took place near a military hospital of the city as Russian paratroopers descended on it. Kharkiv Oblast's Police Chief Volodymyr Tymoshko later stated that the situation was under control.

The Kruty Territorial Council later claimed that nearly 200 Russian soldiers were killed in clashes with Ukrainian armed forces and the Territorial Defense Forces in their village of Kruty, located in Chernihiv Oblast.

Authorities in the city of Konotop negotiated with Russian forces after the mayor stated that Russians had warned him not to resist them or they would destroy the city. An agreement was reached under which Russian forces accepted not to intrude in the city's functioning or deploy troops in return for the residents not attacking them.

3 March
A Russian airstrike on the local power plant on 3 March cut off the electricity and heating supply in the city of Okhtyrka. Five people were reportedly injured from shelling on buildings of the 27th Artillery Brigade and the military department at Sumy State University. That day, Russia claimed it had captured Balakliia.

4 March

Ukrainian forces launched a counterattack in Kharkiv Oblast, reportedly pushing the Russian forces advancing from the Sumy Oblast back beyond the state border.

7 March
Ukraine claimed to have retaken Chuhuiv near Kharkiv in a counter-attack overnight and reportedly killed two Russian commanders: Dmitry Safronov, commander of the 61st Naval Infantry Brigade, and Lt. Col. Denis Glebov, deputy commander of the 11th Guards Air Assault Brigade. During the day, Ukraine also claimed that it had killed Russian Maj. Gen. Vitaly Gerasimov, while also killing and wounding other senior Russian Army officers during a battle near Kharkiv.

8 March

Ukraine stated that it had repelled an attack by Russian forces on Izium. The first evacuation of civilians under an agreement between Ukraine and Russia took place during the day, with residents evacuating from Sumy.

9 March
According to Lyudmyla Denisova, the Commissioner for Human Rights in Ukraine, four civilians were killed when a shell hit their home during the night in the village of Slobozhanske, located in Izium Raion. In Velyka Pysarivka, three civilians were killed due to Russian bombing according to Zhyvytskyi.

10 March
A senior US Defense Department official claimed that Chernihiv was now "isolated". After 01:30, Russian airstrikes destroyed a gas pipeline in Okhtyrka. According to governor Zhyvytskyi, Russian shelling on the territory of the former Elektrobutprilad plant in Trostianets had killed three civilians. At 14:20, Russian forces shelled the city of Nizhyn using BM-27 Uragan, reportedly killing two civilians.

11 March
Two civilians were reportedly killed overnight due to Russian shelling in the village of Kerdylivshchyna in Sumy Oblast. Ukrainian forces later claimed to have recaptured five settlements in the Chernihiv Oblast during the day, including Baklanova Muraviika, in addition to seizing two armored personnel carriers. Russian shelling on Derhachi during the day reportedly killed three civilians.

12 March
The Institute for the Study of War stated that it was likely that counterattacks by the Territorial Defense Forces of Ukraine threaten Russia's long line of communication in this theater. That day, Ukrainian forces reportedly recaptured two more settlements in the Chernihiv Oblast and prevented more Russian forces from advancing towards Kyiv.

14 March
Two civilians were reportedly killed in Russian shelling on houses in Kharkiv, and a child was killed after Russian shelling hit a kindergarten in Chuhuiv.

17 March

At least 21 people were reportedly killed following Russian shelling in Merefa. During the day, the city of Izium was reportedly captured by Russian forces, although fighting continues.

24 March
Russia stated that by the morning of March 24, the city of Izium was completely under control of its units. This claim was denied by Ukrainian officials. The same day a city council deputy told CNN that Russians controlled the northern sector of the city while the southern part was controlled by the Ukrainians, with Russian forces attempting to surround them.

31 March
After several weeks of attacks, and a month under siege, Ukrainian forces managed to break the encirclement of Chernihiv by recapturing a main road connecting Kyiv with the regional capital.

April

1 April
Russian forces captured Izium after a long period of fighting. According to local authorities 80% of Izium's residential buildings were destroyed in the battle.

3 April
According to the Ukrainian government, two Russian soldiers died and 28 others were hospitalized after Ukrainian civilians handed out poisoned cakes to soldiers of the Russian 3rd Motor Rifle Division in Izium.

4 April
Following Ukrainian forces recapturing almost the entirety of Chernihiv Oblast and much of Sumy Oblast the previous day, Governor Zhyvytskyi stated that Russian troops no longer occupied any towns or villages in Sumy Oblast and had mostly withdrawn, while Ukrainian troops were working to push out the remaining units. Governor Chaus stated that the Russian military pulled back from the regional capital of Chernihiv, while "some troops" remained in the province. Russian forces reportedly planted mines in many areas where they retreated from.

6 April
The Pentagon confirmed that the Russian army left Chernihiv Oblast, while Sumy Oblast remained contested.

8 April
Governor Zhyvytskyi stated that all Russians troops left Sumy Oblast. He added that the territory of the region was still unsafe due to rigged explosives and other ammunition left behind by Russian troops.

Counterattack near Kharkiv

6 May
The ISW described a Ukrainian counteroffensive "along a broad arc" near Kharkiv, reporting that Ukraine had recaptured "several villages," including Tsyrkuny, Peremoha and part of Cherkaski Tyshky. The ISW also reported that Ukraine "may successfully push Russian forces out of artillery range in Kharkiv in the coming days."

7 May
It was reported that Ukrainian forces had successfully pushed back Russian forces stationed around Kharkiv, with the city getting further out of range for Russian forces. The same day, Ukrainian forces also reported retaking five villages northeast of Kharkiv. Quoting a Ukrainian official, The New York Times said that the battle for Kharkiv was not over, but that at the moment, Ukraine was dominating, and that Russian troops were destroying bridges as they were retreating.

11 May
Ukrainian forces claimed to have recaptured four settlements. This counteroffensive, if successful, could bring Ukrainian forces within several kilometers of the Russian border.

13 May
It was reported that Russia had decided to withdraw its forces from the Kharkiv Oblast.

14 May
The ISW reports that: “Ukraine thus appears to have won the battle of Kharkiv.” The Mayor of Kharkiv said to the BBC:
"There was no shelling in the city for the last five days. There was only one attempt from Russians to hit the city with a missile rocket near Kharkiv airport, but the missile was eliminated by Ukrainian Air Defence."

Russian counter-attack and continued fighting
After the Ukrainian counteroffensive, Russian forces were driven back to defensive positions, some of which were within miles of the Russia-Ukraine international border. Despite this, they continued to shell various Kharkiv suburbs, as well as the city proper, killing numerous civilians and wounding dozens more. Skirmishes along the Russia–Ukraine border in the area of northeastern Ukraine continued between Russian and Ukrainian forces beyond 14 May.

20 May
Russian forces again shelled several villages in the Kharkiv district, including the city of Kharkiv itself, using BM-21 Grad, BM-27 Uragan and BM-30 Smerch multiple rocket launchers.

21 May
On 21 May, in a statement the Ukrainian police confirmed the recovery of the bodies of six military officials, including a Russian colonel, in the settlement of Zolochiv.

22 May
Russian forces made minimal progress in eastern Ukraine. New reports have confirmed that Russian troops had previously occupied Rubizhne in the northern Kharkiv Oblast on May 19. Russian forces have brought in additional reinforcements to maintain their positions on the west bank of the Seversky Donets River in northern Kharkov - instead of retreating across the river to use it as a defensive position - to prevent any further advance by Ukraine north or east that could to jeopardize Russian lines of communication along the Izium axis.

24 May
Russian forces attempted to retake Ternova in northern Kharkiv Oblast.

6 July
The Russian defence ministry claimed that a Russian airstrike on a "temporary deployment point" of Ukraine's 22nd Motorized Infantry Battalion "destroyed up to 100 Ukrainian nationalists and 4 pieces of military equipment."

13 August
Starting on August 13, Russian forces captured the town of Udy, northeast of Kharkiv. They attempted to push further, and fierce battles occurred in Zolochiv on August 19 and 20, with Ukrainian forces repulsing the attack.

September: End of the campaign

Beginning on September 6, Ukrainian forces launched a counteroffensive in Kharkiv Oblast, successfully recapturing approximately 2,500 square kilometers of territory, before far more, including the cities of Izium, Balakliia, and Kupiansk. The Russian Ministry of Defense then formally announced Russian forces' withdrawal from the majority of Kharkiv Oblast on September 11, with Russia only controlling parts of the region on the east bank of the Oskil River.

See also

 Kyiv offensive (2022)
 Eastern Ukraine offensive
 Southern Ukraine offensive
 2022 Ukrainian Kharkiv counteroffensive

References 

 
Northeastern
February 2022 events in Ukraine
March 2022 events in Ukraine
History of Chernihiv Oblast
History of Kharkiv Oblast
History of Sumy Oblast
Articles containing video clips